The 1938 LEN European Aquatics Championships were held 6–13 August 1938 in London, United Kingdom.

Medal table

Medal summary

Diving
Men's events

Women's events

Swimming
Men's events

Women's events

Water polo

See also
List of European Championships records in swimming

References

European Championships
European Aquatics Championships
LEN European Aquatics Championships
European Aquatics Championships, 1938
European Aquatics Championships
International aquatics competitions hosted by the United Kingdom
European Aquatics Championships